Cernunnos deficiency is a form of combined immunodeficiency characterized by microcephaly, due to mutations in the NHEJ1 gene, it is inherited via autosomal recessive manner Management for this condition is antiviral prophylaxis and antibiotic treatment

Symptoms and signs
The sign and symptoms of this condition on an affected individual are as follows:
 Recurrent infections
 Microcephaly
 Growth retardation
 Bone-malformation
 Dysmorphic feature
 Urogenital malformations

Cause

In terms of genetics the condition, Cernunnos deficiency is due to a mutation in the NHEJ1 gene, it has a cytogenetic location of 2q35, while its molecular location is 219,075,324 to 219,160,865

Mechanism
The pathophysiology of Cernunnos deficiency begins with normal function of Non-homologous end-joining factor 1 gene.
NHEJ1 encodes a protein which helps repair of breaks in double-stranded DNA. It might additionally act as a connection between XRCC4 and other NHEJ factors (at DNA ends)

When a mutation occurs in NHEJ1, then one sees that nucleotide deletions cause V(D)J recombination, signal joints, to be affected. V(D)J recombination is a genetic recombination that happens in early stages of B and T cell maturation.

Diagnosis

The diagnosis of Cernunnos deficiency will find the following in an affected individual via clinical features and blood test:
 B lymphopenia
 T lymphopenia
 Hypogammaglobulinemia with low IgA
 Hypogammaglobulinemia with low IgM

Differencial diagnosis
The DDx for Cernunnos deficiency are both LIG4 syndrome, as well as Nijmegen breakage syndrome

Management
In terms of management for Cernunnos deficiency, one finds that treatment with allogeneic hematopoietic stem cell transplantation, which are stem cells that bring about other cells) has proven useful in some instances. Additionally the following treatments are also used:
 Antibiotic treatment
 Immunoglobulin replacement

See also
 Cernunnos
 Combined immunodeficiency

References

Further reading

External links 
 PubMed

Combined T and B–cell immunodeficiencies